Diedrich Anton Wilhelm Rulfs (March 6, 1848 – February 14, 1926) was a German-American architect in Nacogdoches, Texas.  Rulfs "is aptly called Nacogdoches' master architect for his work in the city between 1879 and 1926."

Rulfs was born in Oldenburg, Lower Saxony, Germany. A number of his works are listed on the National Register of Historic Places.

Works include (with attribution):
Eugene H. Blount House, built 1923, at 1801 North St. Nacogdoches, Texas (Rulfs, Dietrich A.W.), NRHP-listed
Stephen William and Mary Price Blount House, built 1897, at 310 N. Mound St. Nacogdoches, Texas (Rulfs, Dietrich), NRHP-listed
Old Cotton Exchange Building, 305 E. Commerce St. Nacogdoches, Texas (Rulfs, Dietrich A.W.), NRHP-listed
Maria A. Davidson Apartments, 214 S. Fredonia St. Nacogdoches, Texas (Rulfs, Dietrich A.W.), NRHP-listed
Roland Jones House, 141 N. Church St. Nacogdoches, Texas (Rulfs, Dietrich A.W.), NRHP-listed
One or more works in Nacogdoches Downtown Historic District, roughly bounded by Southern Pacific RR tracks, Banita Cr., Pilar, Mound, Arnold, North & Hospital Sts. Nacogdoches, Texas (Rulfs, Dietrich), NRHP-listed
James I. and Myrta Blake Perkins House, 303 E. 5th St. Rusk, Texas (Rulfs, Dietrich A.W.), NRHP-listed
One or more works in Sterne-Hoya Historic District, 100—200 blocks of S. Lanana St., 500 block of E. Main St. (S side), 500 block of E. Pilar St. Nacogdoches, Texas (Rulfs, Dietrich A.W.), NRHP-listed
One or more works in Virginia Avenue Historic District, 500 block of Bremond (W side), 500—1800 blocks of Virginia Ave., 521 Weaver Nacogdoches, Texas (Rulfs, Dietrich A.W.), NRHP-listed
One or more works in Washington Square Historic District, roughly bounded by Houston, Logansport, N. Lanana, E. Hospital and N. Fredonia Sts. Nacogdoches, Texas (Rulfs, Dietrich A.W.), NRHP-listed
One or more works in Zion Hill Historic District, roughly bounded by Park St., Lanana Cr., Oak Grove Cemetery and N. Lanana St. Nacogdoches, Texas (Rulfs, Dietrich A.W.), NRHP-listed

References

Further reading

External links

German emigrants to the United States
1848 births
1926 deaths
People from Nacogdoches, Texas
Architects from Texas
19th-century German architects
People from Oldenburg (city)
20th-century German architects